Stewart Brydon (born 1967) is a Scottish male former racing cyclist, a multiple British national champion on the track in the sprint (British Track Sprint champion six times consecutively ), twice tandem champion with Eddie Alexander and a winner of the Keirin and team sprint titles. He represented Scotland at three Commonwealth Games in 1986, 1990 and 1994.

Palmarès

1986
2nd Tandem, 1986 British National Track Championships
2nd 1 Km sprint, 1986 British National Track Championships

1987
1st Tandem, 1987 British National Track Championships
3rd 1 Km sprint, 1987 British National Track Championships

1988
1st Tandem, 1988 British National Track Championships
2nd 1 Km sprint, 1988 British National Track Championships

1989
1st 1 Km sprint, 1989 British National Track Championships
2nd time trial, 1989 British National Track Championships

1990
1st 1 Km sprint, 1990 British National Track Championships

1991
1st 1 Km sprint, 1991 British National Track Championships

1992
1st 1 Km sprint, 1992 British National Track Championships

1993
1st 1 Km sprint, 1993 British National Track Championships
1st Keirin, 1993 British National Track Championships
1st Team sprint, 1993 British National Track Championships

1994
1st 1 Km sprint, 1994 British National Track Championships
1st Team sprint, 1994 British National Track Championships

1995
1st Team sprint, 1995 British National Track Championships

See also
City of Edinburgh Racing Club
Achievements of members of City of Edinburgh Racing Club

References

1967 births
Living people
Scottish male cyclists
Scottish track cyclists
Cyclists at the 1986 Commonwealth Games
Cyclists at the 1990 Commonwealth Games
Cyclists at the 1994 Commonwealth Games
Cyclists from Glasgow
Commonwealth Games competitors for Scotland